Luciana Souza (born 12 July 1966) is a Brazilian jazz singer and composer who also works in classical and chamber music. Her song Muita Bobeira was featured as a music sample on Windows Vista.

Music career
Grammy winner Luciana Souza is one of jazz's leading singers and interpreters.  Born in São Paulo, Brazil, Ms. Souza’s work transcends traditional boundaries around musical styles. Ms. Souza has performed and recorded with Herbie Hancock, Paul Simon, James Taylor, Bobby McFerrin, Maria Schneider, Danilo Perez, Guillermo Klein, John Patitucci, and many others.  She has been a prominent soloist in important new works by composers Osvaldo Golijov, Derek Bermel, Patrick Zimmerli, Rachel Grimes, Angelica Negron, Shara Nova, Caroline Shaw, and Sarah Kirkland Snider, performing with the New York Philharmonic, the Atlanta Symphony, the Los Angeles Philharmonic, the Los Angeles Chamber Orchestra, the American Composers Orchestra, the Los Angeles Guitar Quartet, and A Far Cry.

Ms. Souza has been releasing celebrated recordings since 2002 - including her six Grammy-nominated records Brazilian Duos, North and South, Duos II, Tide, Duos III, and The Book of Chet.  Her critically acclaimed ninth recording for the Sunnyside label, The Book of Longing, presents her settings of poems by Leonard Cohen, Emily Dickinson, Edna St. Vincent Millay, and Christina Rossetti.

Ms. Souza began her recording career at age three with a radio commercial.  She spent four years on faculty at Berklee College of Music, where she received a Bachelor's in Jazz Composition.  Ms. Souza earned a Master's degree in Jazz Studies from the New England Conservatory of Music and taught for four years at Manhattan School of Music.  Ms. Souza has twice been named Best Female Jazz Singer by the Jazz Journalists Association, in 2005 and 2013.

Awards and honors
Souza won a Grammy Award in 2007 as a featured vocalist on Herbie Hancock's album River: The Joni Letters. She was nominated for Best Jazz Vocal Album for  Brazilian Duos (2003), North and South (2004), Duos II (2006), Tide (2010), and The Book of Chet (2013). She was nominated for Best Latin Jazz Album for  Duos III (2013). She was named Female Singer of the Year in 2005 and 2013 by the Jazz Journalists Association.

Discography

As leader
 An Answer to Your Silence (NYC, 1998)
 The Poems of Elizabeth Bishop and Other Songs (Sunnyside, 2000)
 Brazilian Duos (Biscoito Fino, 2002)
 Norte e Sul (Biscoito Fino, 2003)
 Neruda (Sunnyside, 2004)
 Duos II (Sunnyside, 2005)
 The New Bossa Nova (Verve, 2007)
 Tide (Verve, 2009)
 Duos III (Sunnyside, 2012)
 The Book of Chet (Sunnyside, 2012)
 Speaking in Tongues (Sunnyside, 2015)
 The Book of Longing (Sunnyside, 2018)
 Storytellers (Sunnyside, 2020)

As guest 

With Till Bronner
 Oceana (Verve, 2006)
 Rio (Verve, 2008)

With Guillermo Klein
 Los Guachos II (Sunnyside, 1999)
 Los Guachos III (Sunnyside, 2002)

With Donny McCaslin
 The Way Through (Arabesque, 2003)
 Soar (Sunnyside, 2006)

With Bob Moses
 1993: Time Stood Still (Gramavision, 1994)
 1998: Nishoma (Grapeshots, 2000)

With John Patitucci
 Communion (Concord Jazz, 2001)
 Songs, Stories & Spirituals (Concord, 2003)

With Madeleine Peyroux
 Bare Bones (Rounder/Decca, 2009)
 Anthem (Decca, 2018)

With Maria Schneider
 Concert in the Garden (ArtistShare, 2004)
 Sky Blue (ArtistShare, 2007)

With Edward Simon
 Simplicitas (Criss Cross, 2005)
 David Binney, Oceanos (Criss Cross, 2007)

With others
 Clarice Assad, Imaginarium (Adventure Music, 2014)
 Cyro Baptista, Beat the Donkey (Tzadik, 2002)
 Adoniran Barbosa, O Poeta do Bexiga (Som Livre, 1990)
 Walter Becker, Circus Money (Mailboat, 2008)
 Derek Bermel and Alarm Will Sound, Canzonas Americanas (Cantaloupe, 2012)
 Stephen Bishop, Romance in Rio (One Eighty Music, 2007)
 Oscar Castro-Neves, All One (Mack Avenue, 2006)
 George Garzone, Alone (NYC, 1995)
 Aaron Goldberg, Worlds (Sunnyside, 2006)
 Osvaldo Golijov, Oceana (Deutsche Grammophon, 2007)
 Herbie Hancock, River: The Joni Letters (Verve, 2007)
 Fred Hersch, Two Hands Ten Voices (2004)
 Steve Kuhn, The Best Things (Reservoir, 2000)
 Los Angeles Guitar Quartet, LAGQ Brazil (Telarc, 2007)
 Arthur Maia, Arthur Maia (Paradoxx, 1997)
 Gregoire Maret, Wanted (Sunnyside, 2016)
 Bobby McFerrin, Vocabularies (Emarcy, 2010)
 Vince Mendoza, Nights On Earth (Art of Groove, 2011)
 Hermeto Pascoal, Festa Dos Deuses (Polygram, 1992)
 Clarence Penn, Saomaye (Verve, 2002)
 Danilo Perez, Central Avenue (Impulse!, 1998)
 Rebecca Pidgeon,  Behind the Velvet Curtain (Great American Music Company, 2008)
 Tim Ries, The Rolling Stones Project (Concord, 2005)
 Yellowjackets, Raising Our Voice (Mack Avenue, 2018)
 Miguel Zenon, Ceremonial (Marsalis Music, 2004)

Further reading
 Block, Melissa. "Luciana Souza: From Bossa Nova to Chet Baker". (NPR) August 31, 2012.
 Blumenfeld, Larry. "Loneliness in Two Languages". The Wall Street Journal. August 27, 2012
 Garsd, Jasmine. "Saudade - An Unstoppable, Undeniably Potent Word". NPR, Alt Latino. February 28, 2014.
 Jacki Lyden. "Souza Lends a Fresh Note to Brazilian Music". NPR. May 14, 2005.
 McGowan, Chris. "Luciana Souza: A Bossa Nova Baby Makes Her Way in the Jazz Realm". The Huffington Post. January 4, 2014.
 McGowan, Chris. The Brazilian Music Book: Brazil's Singers, Songwriters and Musicians Tell the Story of Bossa Nova, MPB, and Brazilian Jazz and Pop. Culture Planet, June 2014
 Morrison, Allen. "Distill Everything". Down Beat. October 2012
 Ratliff, Ben. "Guitar and Conversation: A Singer at Ease with Her Roots". The New York Times. November 27, 2001
 Smith, Steve. "Crossing Borders with Allure". The New York Times. April 7, 2014
 Teachout, Terry. "She's Brazilian, Tempered by a Bit of Everything Else". The New York Times. August 4, 2002

References

External links
 Official site

1966 births
Living people
Berklee College of Music alumni
Brazilian jazz composers
Brazilian jazz singers
Manhattan School of Music faculty
Singers from São Paulo
Sunnyside Records artists
Verve Records artists
Women in Latin music